Clavatula sacerdos is a species of sea snail, a marine gastropod mollusk in the family Clavatulidae.

Description
The size of an adult shell varies between 17 mm and 27 mm.

Distribution
This species occurs in the Atlantic Ocean from the Western Sahara to Senegal.

References

External links
 

sacerdos
Gastropods described in 1845